Ian Flannon Taylor is an American musician from Palm Desert, California. Taylor plays rhythm guitar in The Adolescents and was the long-time guitarist for Mondo Generator. Taylor was the front-man for 1990s San Diego skate punk band Furious IV and UNSOUND, (an early 1990s influential punk rock band from Palm Springs/Palm Desert, CA) and key member of what became known as the "Low Desert Sound".

In 2011, Taylor released a solo record titled The Sounds Between Us.
Taylor owns a carpentry company called "Taylor Design And Build", which specializes in custom furniture, ADA modifications for local businesses, as well as scenery for theaters and television shows.
In 2014, Taylor was tapped by veteran punk rock band the Adolescents by founding member Tony Cadena A.K.A Tony Montana A.K.A Tony Reflex to play guitar on tour. As of summer 2015, he is a full-time member of the band.

References

Living people
People from Lake Arrowhead, California
People from Palm Desert, California
Mondo Generator members
Rhythm guitarists
1971 births